The World Masters Orienteering Championships (WMOC) (formerly the Veteran World Cup) is an annual orienteering competition organized by the International Orienteering Federation (IOF).
 

Participants must 35 years of age or older. The classes of competition are divided into women and men in five-year age groups from 35 to 100+ with a total of 28 classes.

The first competition was held in 1983 in Lahti, Finland. However, the event was not sanctioned by the IOF until 1988. From 1986 to 1994, the competition was held biannually. In 1998, the event changed its name to the World Masters Orienteering Championships.

Until 2008, the competition consisted of a long ("classic") distance race with 2 qualification runs, after which a sprint race was added to the program. In 2018, a middle-distance race was added as well.

Venues

References

Master
Junior
Recurring sporting events established in 1996